Truitt is a surname, and may refer to:

Arts and entertainment
Anne Truitt (1921–2004), American artist
Daniel Truitt, American drag queen
Sonny Truitt, jazz musician, worked with Miles Davis

Politics
Catherine Truitt, American politician from North Carolina
Dan Truitt, former Member of the Pennsylvania House of Representatives from the 156th district (2010-2016)
George Truitt (1756–1818), American politician from Delaware; state legislator and governor of Delaware 1808–11
Oadline Truitt (b. 1940), American politician from New Jersey; state legislator 2006–08
Randy Truitt, politician in Indiana, USA 
Vicki Truitt (born 1954), Texan politician and lobbyist

Sport
Ansley Truitt (born 1950), basketball player 
Dave Truitt (b. 1964), American football player (tight end)
Frank Truitt (b. 1925), American collegiate coach and World War II veteran
Greg Truitt (born 1965), American football player for Cincinnati Bengals
Olanda Truitt (b. 1971), American football player (wide receiver)
R. V. Truitt (1890–1991), American zoologist and lacrosse coach

Other
Anna Augusta Truitt (1837–1920), philanthropist, temperance reformer, essayist
James Truitt (d. 1981), American journalist
Stephen M. Truitt (contemporary), American activist lawyer; represents some of the Guantánamo prisoners
R. V. Truitt (1890–1991), American zoologist and lacrosse coach

See also
Trewhitt
Truett (name)